Trolleboda  is a village in Ronneby Municipality, Blekinge County, southeastern Sweden. It contains a 17th-century windmill.

Villages in Sweden